Virginia's 82nd House of Delegates district elects one of 100 seats in the Virginia House of Delegates, the lower house of the state's bicameral legislature. The district contains part of Virginia Beach. Since 2016, the seat has been held by Republican Jason Miyares who was elected as Attorney General of Virginia in the 2021 election. Anne Ferrell Tata was elected to the seat in the 2021 election.

District officeholders

Electoral history

References

Virginia House of Delegates districts
Virginia Beach, Virginia